The fourspine sculpin (Cottus kazika) is a species of freshwater ray-finned fish belonging to the family Cottidae, the typical sculpins. It is endemic to Japan. It reaches a maximum length of 30.0 cm (11.8 in).

Taxonomy
The fourspine sculpin was first formally described in 1904 by the American ichthyologists David Starr Jordan and Edwin Chapin Starks with its type locality given as Niigata in Japan. This species is placed in the monospecific genus Rheopresbe by some authorities, as molecular analyses indicated that this species was a sister taxon to Trachidermus fasciatus, another catadromous Japanese sculpin. The specific name kazika is a Japanese word for river sculpins.

References

Fish of Japan
Cottus (fish)
Fish described in 1904
Taxa named by David Starr Jordan
Taxa named by Edwin Chapin Starks